Psotka is a surname. Notable people with the surname include:

 Jozef Psotka (1934–1984), Slovak mountaineer
 Zdeněk Psotka (born 1973), Czech footballer